Ndonga may refer to:
 Ndonga dialect, a standardized dialect of the Ovambo language spoken in Namibia and parts of Angola
 Ndonga Linena Constituency, an electoral constituency in the Kavango East Region of Namibia
 Hervé Ndonga (born 1992), a footballer from DR Congo
 ZANU - Ndonga, a Zimbabwe political party formed along with ZANU-PF when ZANU split